The 1988 Victorian state election, held on Saturday, 1 October 1988, was for the 51st Parliament of Victoria. It was held in the Australian state of Victoria to elect all 88 members of the state's Legislative Assembly and 22 members of the 44-member Legislative Council.

The incumbent Labor Party government led by Premier John Cain Jr. won a third term in office, despite a swing against it, and only lost the seat of Warrandyte in Melbourne's north-east. This was credited by commentators to a strong campaign targeting Liberal leader Jeff Kennett whose aggressive leadership style was still seen as a liability, as well as continuing instability in the federal Coalition. Labor's narrow wins in middle class marginal seats saw it retain its majority despite the Liberals winning a bare majority of the two party preferred vote.

Results

Legislative Assembly

|}

Legislative Council

|}

Seats changing hands

Members listed in italics did not recontest their seats.

Key dates

Post-election pendulum

Aftermath
On 23 May 1989, Jeff Kennett was voted out of the Liberal leadership in favour of Alan Brown; Brown led the party until 23 April 1991 when he was also forced out after a successful comeback by Kennett. During Brown's period as Opposition Leader, the Liberals negotiated the first coalition agreement with the Nationals in over forty years, in part due to a belief by some (in spite of what political scientist Brian Costar called a "lack of psephological evidence to support this assertion") that had the parties been in coalition at the election, they would have won.

References

See also
Candidates of the 1988 Victorian state election

Elections in Victoria (Australia)
1988 elections in Australia
1980s in Victoria (Australia)
October 1988 events in Australia
John Cain